Festus Akinbusoye is a British Conservative politician who was elected as Bedfordshire Police and Crime Commissioner at the 2021 election. Akinbusoye is the first black Briton to be elected to this role. He is also the only PCC from a Black, Asian and Minority ethnic background following the 2021 election.

Early life 
Akinbusoye emigrated to the UK from Nigeria as a thirteen-year-old with his parents and twin sister where they settled in Canning Town, East London.

He studied at St Paul's Way School, Bow before studying A Levels at City of Westminster College. He graduated with a Bachelors Degree in Business Communications from London College of Printing and Distributive Trades and read for a Masters Degree in International Studies and Diplomacy at the School of Oriental and African Studies.

Akinbusoye's experiences with Stop and Search as a young man growing up in London and time mentoring young offenders in prison shaped some of his approach towards policing.

Political career 
Akinbusoye has worked as Senior Parliamentary Assistant to Mark Lancaster, Iain Stewart and Ben Everitt.

He stood as a Conservative candidate in the West Ham constituency in the 2015 United Kingdom general election coming second to Lyn Brown.

Akinbusoye served as Chairman of Milton Keynes Conservatives from 2018 to 2021.

References 

Police and crime commissioners in England
Living people
Conservative Party police and crime commissioners
Black British politicians
Nigerian emigrants to the United Kingdom
People from Canning Town
People from Milton Keynes
Year of birth missing (living people)